The Bonetta class was a class of three sloops of wooden construction built for the Royal Navy between 1755 and 1756. All three were built by contract with commercial builders to a common design prepared by Thomas Slade, the Surveyor of the Navy.

All three were ordered on 9 July 1755, assigned names on 29 July 1755, and were built as two-masted snow-rigged vessels.

Vessels

References 

McLaughlan, Ian. The Sloop of War 1650-1763. Seaforth Publishing, 2014. .
Winfield, Rif. British Warships in the Age of Sail 1714-1792: Design, Construction, Careers and Fates. Seaforth Publishing, 2007. .

Sloop classes